Dicranum majus is a species of moss belonging to the family Dicranaceae.

It is native to the Northern Hemisphere.

References

Dicranales